Tomas Johansson may refer to:

Tomas Johansson (badminton) (born 1969), Swedish badminton player at the 1996 and 2000 Summer Olympics
Tomas Johansson (snowboarder) (born 1979), Swedish snowboarder at the 2002 Winter Olympics
Tomas Johansson (sport shooter) (born 1974), Swedish sport shooter at the 2000 Summer Olympics
Tomas Johansson (wrestler) (born 1962), Swedish wrestler, medalist at the 1988 and 1992 Summer Olympics

See also
Thomas Johansson (disambiguation)
Tommy Johansson (disambiguation)
Thomas Johanson (born 1969), Finnish sailor and Olympic champion